Victoria Dumitrescu (1 December 1935 – 22 December 2009), nicknamed Victorița, was a Romanian handballer who played for the Romanian national team. At club level, she played for Steagu Roșu București.

Individual awards 
 World Championship Top Scorer: 1956

References

 
 
1935 births
2009 deaths 
Sportspeople from Bucharest
Romanian female handball players